Inquisitor lanceolatus is an extinct species of sea snail, a marine gastropod mollusk in the family Pseudomelatomidae, the turrids and allies.

Description
The length of the shell attains 27.5 mm.

Distribution
This extinct marine species was found in Miocene strata of the Navidad Formation, Central Chile.

References

 Hupé, H. 1854. Malacología y conquiliología. In C. Gay (Ed.): Historia física y política de Chile. Vol. 8 und Atlas (Zoológica). Maulde et Renou, Paris, 449 S.

External links
 

lanceolatus
Gastropods described in 1854